Carl Johan Fredrik Engelstad (11 November 1915 – 1 October 1996) was a Norwegian writer, playwright, journalist, translator and theatre director.

Personal life
Engelstad was born in Hadsel as the son of jurist Sigurd Engelstad (1878–1916) and younger brother of archivist Sigurd Engelstad.

He married Vibeke Engelstad, a physician. Their son Fredrik became a professor of sociology, and married professor Irene Johnson.

Career
Carl Fredrik Engelstad was hired as a theatre critic in Morgenbladet in 1945. He stayed here until 1960, the last two years as cultural editor. He was theatre director for Nationaltheatret from 1960 to 1961, and from 1965 he worked in Aftenposten. He was known for writing from a Christian viewpoint.

From 1946 to 1949 he also edited the periodical Spektrum. He debuted as a writer in 1949, with two plays. His novels included Gjester i mørket (1958), Størst blant dem (1977) and De levendes land (1986). For the two latter novels, Engelstad was awarded the Norwegian Critics Prize for Literature. He also wrote books about Francis of Assisi, Ronald Fangen, Ludvig Holberg and Johan Herman Wessel, among others.

Awards
Norwegian Critics Prize for Literature 1977, 1986
Riksmål Society Literature Prize 1986

References

1915 births
1996 deaths
Norwegian essayists
Norwegian theatre directors
Norwegian theatre critics
20th-century Norwegian translators
20th-century Norwegian novelists
20th-century Norwegian dramatists and playwrights
20th-century essayists
Norwegian male dramatists and playwrights
Norwegian male novelists
20th-century Norwegian journalists
People from Hadsel